A royal family is the immediate family of kings/queens, emirs/emiras, sultans/sultanas, or raja/rani and sometimes their extended family. The term imperial family appropriately describes the family of an emperor or empress, and the term papal family describes the family of a pope, while the terms baronial family, comital family, ducal family, archducal family, grand ducal family, or princely family are more appropriate to describe, respectively, the relatives of a reigning baron, count/earl, duke, archduke, grand duke, or prince. However, in common parlance members of any family which reigns by hereditary right are often referred to as royalty or "royals". It is also customary in some circles to refer to the extended relations of a deposed monarch and their descendants as a royal family. A dynasty is sometimes referred to as the "House of ...". In July 2013 there were 26 active sovereign dynasties in the world that ruled or reigned over 43 monarchies.

, while there are several European countries whose nominal head of state, by long tradition, is a king or queen, the associated royal families, with the notable exception of the British royal family, are non-notable ordinary citizens who may bear a title but are not involved in public affairs.

Members of a royal family

A royal family typically includes the spouse of the reigning monarch, surviving spouses of a deceased monarch, the children, grandchildren, brothers, sisters, and paternal cousins of the reigning monarch, as well as their spouses. In some cases, royal family membership may extend to great grandchildren and more distant descendants of a monarch. In certain monarchies where voluntary abdication is the norm, such as the Netherlands, a royal family may also include one or more former monarchs. In certain instances, such as in Canada, the royal family is defined by who holds the styles Majesty and Royal Highness. There is often a distinction between persons of the blood royal and those that marry into the royal family. Under most systems, only persons in the first category are dynasts, that is, potential successors to the throne (unless the member of the latter category is also in line to the throne in their own right, a frequent occurrence in royal families which frequently intermarry). This is not always observed; some monarchies have operated by the principle of jure uxoris.

In addition, certain relatives of the monarch (by blood or marriage) possess special privileges and are subject to certain statutes, conventions, or special common law. The precise functions of a royal family vary depending on whether the polity in question is an absolute monarchy, a constitutional monarchy, or somewhere in between. In certain monarchies, such as that found in Saudi Arabia or Kuwait, or in political systems where the monarch actually exercises executive power, such as in Jordan, it is not uncommon for the members of a royal family to hold important government posts or military commands. In most constitutional monarchies, however, members of a royal family perform certain public, social, or ceremonial functions, but refrain from any involvement in electoral politics or the actual governance of the country.

The specific composition of royal families varies from country to country, as do the titles and royal and noble styles held by members of the family. The composition of the royal family may be regulated by statute enacted by the legislature (e.g., Spain, the Netherlands, and Japan since 1947), the sovereign's prerogative and common law tradition (e.g., the United Kingdom), or a private house law (e.g., Liechtenstein, the former ruling houses of Bavaria, Prussia, Hanover, etc.). Public statutes, constitutional provisions, or conventions may also regulate the marriages, names, and personal titles of royal family members. The members of a royal family may or may not have a surname or dynastic name (see Royal House).

In a constitutional monarchy, when the monarch dies, there is always a law or tradition of succession to the throne that either specifies a formula for identifying the precise order of succession among family members in line to the throne or specifies a process by which a family member is chosen to inherit the crown. Usually in the former case the exact line of hereditary succession among royal individuals may be identified at any given moment during prior reigns (e.g. United Kingdom, Sark, Nizari Ismailis, Japan, Balobedus, Sweden, Kingdom of Benin) whereas in the latter case the next sovereign may be selected (or changed) only during the reign or shortly after the demise of the immediately preceding monarch (e.g. Cambodia, KwaZulu Natal, Buganda, Saudi Arabia, Swaziland, Yorubaland, The Kingitanga). Some monarchies employ a mix of these selection processes (Malaysia, Monaco, Tonga, Jordan, Morocco), providing for both an identifiable line of succession as well as authority for the monarch, dynasty or other institution to alter the line in specific instances without changing the general law of succession. 

Some countries have abolished royalty altogether, as in post-revolutionary France (1870), post-revolutionary Russia (1917), Portugal (1910), post-war Germany (1918), post-war Italy (1946) and many ex European colonies.

Current royal families

Africa
 Lesotho royal family
 Moroccan royal family
 Swazi royal family
 List of current constituent African monarchs

Middle East
 Bahraini royal family
 Emirati princely families
 Jordanian royal family
 Kuwaiti princely family
 Omani sultanic family
 Qatari princely family
 Saudi royal family

Asia
 Bruneian royal family
 Bhutanese royal family
 Cambodian royal family
 Japanese imperial family
 Malaysian royal families
 Johor royal family
 Kedah royal family
 Kelantan royal family
 Negeri Sembilan royal family
 Pahang royal family
 Perak royal family
 Perlis royal family
 Selangor royal family
 Terengganu royal family
 Thai royal family
 List of current constituent Asian monarchs

Europe
 Belgian royal family
 British royal family	
 Danish royal family
 Dutch royal family
 Liechtenstein princely family
 Luxembourg grand ducal family
 Monegasque princely family
 Norwegian royal family
 Spanish royal family
 Swedish royal family

Oceania
 Australian royal family
 New Zealander royal family
 Papuan royal family
 Solomon Islands royal family
 Tongan royal family
 Tuvaluan royal family

North America
 Antiguan royal family
 Bahamian royal family
 Belizean royal family
 Canadian royal family
 Grenadian royal family
 Jamaican royal family
 Miskito royal family
 Saint Kitts and Nevis royal family
 Saint Lucian royal family
 Vincentian royal family

Deposed royal families

Africa
 Central African imperial family
 Egyptian royal family
 Ethiopian imperial family
 Gambian royal family
 Ghanaian royal family
 Kenyan royal family
 Lybian royal family
 Malawian royal family
 Mauritian royal family
 Nigerian royal family
 Rwandan royal family
 Rhodesian (Zimbabwean) royal family
 Sierra Leonean royal family
 South African royal family
 Tanganykan (Tanzanian) royal family
 Tunisian royal family
 Ugandan royal family
 Umurundi royal family

Middle East
 Ottoman (Turkish) imperial family
 Iranian imperial family
 Iraqi royal family
 Yemeni royal family

Asia
 Afghan royal family
 Bengali royal family
 Burmese royal family
 Ceylonese (Sri Lankan) royal family
 Chinese imperial family
 Indian imperial family
 Baroda royal family
 Royal family of Dhaka
 Jodhpur royal family
 Mysore roya Family (Wadiyar dynasty)
 Korean imperial family
 Laotian royal family
 Maldivian sultanic family
 Nepalese royal family
 Pakistani royal family
 Singaporean sultanic family
 Khiva (Turkmen) royal family
 Bhukaran (Uzbek) royal family
 Vietnamese imperial family

Europe
 Albanian royal family
 Austrian imperial family
 Bohemian (Czech) royal family
 Bulgarian royal family
 Croatian royal family
 Finnish royal family
 Georgian royal family
 French imperial family
 German imperial family
 Bavarian royal family
 Saxon royal family
 Württemberg royal family
 Baden grand ducal family
 Hessian grand ducal family
 Mecklenburg (Schwerin and Strelitz) grand ducal family
 Oldenburg grand ducal family
 Saxe-Weimar-Eisenach grand ducal family
Anhalt ducal family
Brunswick ducal family
Saxe-Coburg and Gotha ducal family
Saxe-Meiningen ducal family
Lippe-Detmold princely family
 Greek royal family
 Irish royal family
 Italian royal family
 Hungarian royal family
 Lithuanian royal family
 Maltese royal family
 Montenegrin royal family
 Polish royal family (Congress Poland)
 Portuguese royal family
 Romanian royal family
 Russian imperial family
 Serbian royal family

Oceania
 Fijian royal family
 Hawaiian royal family

North America
 Barbadian royal family
 Haitian imperial family
 Mexican imperial family
 Miskito royal family
 Trinidad and Tobago royal family

South America

 Brazilian imperial family
 Mask of Ferdinand VII context
 Argentine royal family (United Provinces of the Río de la Plata)
 Chilean royal family (Kingdom of Chile)
 Colombian royal family (Free and Independent State of Cundinamarca)
 Venezuelan royal family (Supreme Junta)
 Guyanese royal family

Mediatised princely families
Whilst mediatization occurred in other countries such as France, Italy and Russia, only the certain houses within the former Holy Roman Empire are collectively called the Mediatized Houses.

 Arenberg ducal family (Belgium)
 Fürstenberg princely family (Germany)
 Ligne princely family (Belgium)
 Merode princely family (Belgium)
 Schwarzenberg princely family (Bohemia)
 Thurn und Taxis princely family (Germany)

Dynasties

See also

 Abolished monarchy
 Born in the purple
 Chief of the Name
 Crown prince
 Divine right of kings
 Dynasty
 First Family (in some republican states)
 Family trees of royal families
 Nobility
 Palace
 Prince
 Prince consort
 Princeps
 Princess
 Raja
 Rana (title)
 Rani (disambiguation)
 Princess Royal
 Queen consort
 Regicide
 Royal and noble styles
 Royal descent
 Rao (Indian surname)
 Royal prerogative

References

External links